Massie House, also known as Oak Grove, was a historic home located at Falling Spring, Alleghany County, Virginia. It was built in two phases in 1825–1826, and was a double-pile, two-story, five bay, wood-frame house on a brick foundation in the Federal style. The main entrance featured the original paneled double-doors ornamented with small Chinese and Gothic motifs, flanked by sidelights and topped by a segmental fanlight.

It was added to the National Register of Historic Places in 1982.

In 2018, the tract of land including Massie House was sold in a court-ordered auction. By 2020, Massie House had been demolished.

References

Houses on the National Register of Historic Places in Virginia
Federal architecture in Virginia
Houses completed in 1826
Houses in Alleghany County, Virginia
National Register of Historic Places in Alleghany County, Virginia
1826 establishments in Virginia
U.S. Route 220